The James Hutton Institute is an interdisciplinary scientific research institute in Scotland established in 2011, through the merger of Scottish Crop Research Institute (SCRI) and the Macaulay Land Use Research Institute. The institute, named after Scottish geologist James Hutton, one of the leading figures of the Scottish Enlightenment, combines existing Scottish expertise in agricultural research, soils and land use, and works in fields including food and energy security, biodiversity, and climate change. With more than 600 employees, the institute is among the largest research centres in the UK. It is a registered charity under Scottish law.

The institute has its main offices in Aberdeen and Dundee with farms and field research stations at Glensaugh and Balruddery. The Dundee site also hosts the Plant Sciences department of the University of Dundee.

The James Hutton Institute also formally contains Biomathematics and Statistics Scotland (BioSS) which has staff based in Edinburgh, Dundee, Aberdeen and Ayr. BioSS undertakes research, consultancy and training in mathematics and statistics as applied to agriculture, the environment, food and health. Strategic oversight of the development of BioSS is provided by a Strategic Planning Group composed of senior representatives from BioSS' principal stakeholders.

BioSS and the James Hutton Institute are two of a family of six organisations termed the Main Research Providers for the Scottish Government Rural and Environment Research and Analytical Services Division (RESAS).

In 2012, the institute announced that it was formally joining the Natural Capital Initiative, a leading UK partnership that brings together policymakers, scientists, business, industry to find the most effective ways safeguard important ecosystems and natural capital.

Projects led by the institute to establish an International Barley Hub and an Advanced Plant Growth Centre in Dundee have been supported through the Tay Cities Deal with a £62m investment.

References

Agricultural organisations based in Scotland
Research institutes in Scotland
Environmental research institutes
Agricultural research institutes in the United Kingdom
2011 establishments in Scotland
Organisations based in Aberdeen
Organisations based in Dundee
2011 in science
Public bodies of the Scottish Government
Government agencies established in 2011
Science and technology in Aberdeen
Science and technology in Dundee
Charities based in Scotland